Ignazio da Laconi (10 December 1701 - 11 May 1781) - born Vincenzo Peis - was a Roman Catholic professed religious born in Sardinia, and a member of the Order of Friars Minor Capuchin. His conquering a serious illness prompted him to consecrate his life to God and therefore entered the religious life though not as an ordained priest. Peis was better known in Sardinia for his humble demeanor coupled with his concern for those who were poor. He mingled with all people he met and was generous towards those who were ill. But he became known as a wonder worker and it was claimed that he had performed 121 miracles during his life.

Peis' grave soon became a place where miracles reportedly flourished and this was one dimension towards the opening of his cause for canonization. He was beatified on 16 June 1940 and was canonized later in 1951. His body in Cagliari is still incorrupt.

Life
Vincenzo Peis was born on 10 December 1701 in Sardinia, the second of seven children of poor peasants Mattia Peis Cadello and Anna Maria Sanna Casu. He was baptized as "Francesco Ignazio Vincenzo" since he was born of a difficult pregnancy in which his mother invoked the intercession of Francis of Assisi.

Peis worked in the fields to help support his parents. He suffered a serious illness ca. 1719 (aged seventeen) that made him vow that he would consecrate himself to God and join the Order of Friars Minor Capuchin if he managed to recover from it. He recovered but put off the fulfilment of the vow after his father convinced him to wait; his father was anxious about it because he depended on Peis for support in the fields. But there seems to be some indication that his parents objected to his entering the order. In 1721 he was in danger once more when the horse he was riding panicked. He could have been thrown off but he called upon the assistance of Francis of Assisi and renewed the vow he had made during his illness. This time his parents did not raise objections to his becoming a friar and granted him their blessing. In his childhood he often called the local church his "home" and took Lawrence of Brindisi as his personal role model.

He asked for admission at the convent in Cagliari but the superiors there hesitated because of his delicate health. He then called upon an influential friend who interceded for him and he was allowed to be received into the novitiate on 10 November 1721. Peis made his profession on 10 November 1722. Despite his infirmities his ardor allowed him to attend the spiritual exercises of the order and to excel in perfection of his observance of the order's Rule. From 1722 until 1737 he worked at the house's weaving shed and from 1737 onwards was an alms beggar.

Peis spent his time in a number of different occupations and was later appointed as the quester of alms due to his humble and modest conduct. He had good relations with the people in Cagliari who realized that although he was begging alms he was also giving back to them in a spiritual manner. His modest demeanor was seen as a quiet sermon for all who saw him going about, which made him a noted figure. He seldom spoke; when required he spoke with exceptional kindness and great affection. He would also instruct the children and the uneducated that he came across, and went out to comfort the sick and urge sinners to be converted and to perform penance.

He was known for his strict and total obedience to his superiors, even when it required the denial of his own will. He would not go to the house of a certain usurer because he feared that in accepting alms from the man he would share the guilt of his injustices. But when the man complained his superior ordered him to accept alms from him. However, when he returned to the friary and opened the sack with the alms the usurer had offered, blood started flowing out. To those present Peis replied: "This is the blood of the poor; squeezed from them by usury". Peis' sister had often written to him asking him to visit her so that she could get his advice in certain matters. Peis had no mind to heed her request but when his superior ordered him to, he at once undertook the visit. But he left again as soon as he had given the required advice. Peis' brother was sent to prison and it was hoped that, in view of his reputation, Peis might obtain his release. His superior sent him to speak to the governor; but he simply asked that his brother be dealt with according to justice.

Despite poor health and infirmities he continued his work, however arduous. Even after he became blind in 1779, he continued to work for the benefit of those around him. Peis died on 11 May 1781 at 3:00pm in Cagliari, where his remains were interred.

Canonization
The cause for canonization opened after his death in 1844 (local level) and there were numerous reports of miracles attributed to him occurring at his tomb. The cause commenced and investigated the life and works of the late friar (a Positio was sent to the Congregation for Rites in 1868) while the confirmation of his heroic virtue enabled Pope Pius IX - on 26 May 1869 - to title Peis as Venerable. The confirmation of two miracles attributed to him (occurring after death) enabled Pope Pius XII to preside over his beatification on 16 June 1940. The ratification of an additional two miracles (occurring after beatification) allowed for Pius XII to canonize the friar on 21 October 1951 in Saint Peter's Basilica.

The Positio dossier compiled during the cause noted that there were 121 miracles attributed to Peis during his life with an additional 86 reported after his death.

Patronage and legacy
Peis is known as a patron saint for beggars and students. On 11 May 2007 he was proclaimed as the patron saint of the Oristano province in an official decree. On 11 May 2014 a statue dedicated to him was unveiled in Sestu.

References

External links
 Hagiography Circle
 Capuchin Franciscans - Province of Saint Mary
 Saint Mary's Press

1701 births
1781 deaths
18th-century Christian saints
18th-century Italian people
18th-century venerated Christians
Beatifications by Pope Pius XII
Canonizations by Pope Pius XII
Capuchins
Capuchin saints
Franciscan saints
Italian Roman Catholic saints
Italian saints
Italian venerated Catholics
People from the Province of Oristano
Miracle workers